Bernoulli can refer to:

People
Bernoulli family of 17th and 18th century Swiss mathematicians:
Daniel Bernoulli (1700–1782), developer of Bernoulli's principle
Jacob Bernoulli (1654–1705), also known as Jacques, after whom Bernoulli numbers are named
Jacob II Bernoulli (1759–1789)
Johann Bernoulli (1667–1748)
Johann II Bernoulli (1710–1790)
Johann III Bernoulli (1744–1807), also known as Jean, astronomer
Nicolaus I Bernoulli (1687–1759)
Nicolaus II Bernoulli (1695–1726)
Elisabeth Bernoulli (1873–1935), Swiss temperance campaigner
Hans Benno Bernoulli (1876–1959), Swiss architect
Ludwig Bernoully (1873–1928), German architect

Mathematics
 Bernoulli differential equation
 Bernoulli distribution and Bernoulli random variable
 Bernoulli's inequality
 Bernoulli's triangle
 Bernoulli number
 Bernoulli polynomials
 Bernoulli process
 Bernoulli trial
 Lemniscate of Bernoulli

Science
 2034 Bernoulli, minor planet
 Bernoulli's principle, or Bernoulli effect in fluid dynamics
 Bernoulli (crater), lunar crater
 Euler–Bernoulli beam theory, model of a bending beam

Other
 Bernoulli Box, a removable disk storage system based on the Bernoulli effect
 Bernard Bernoulli, a character in the 1987 video game Maniac Mansion
Francesco Bernoulli, a character in the 2011 animated film Cars 2